The International Astronomical Union (IAU) designates 88 constellations of stars. In the table below, they are ranked by the solid angle that they subtend in the sky, measured in square degrees and millisteradians.

These solid angles depend on arbitrary boundaries between the constellations: the list below is based on constellation boundaries drawn up by Eugène Delporte in 1930 on behalf of the IAU and published in Délimitation scientifique des constellations (Cambridge University Press). Before Delporte's work, there was no standard list of the boundaries of each constellation.

Delporte drew the boundaries along vertical and horizontal lines of right ascension and declination; however, he did so for the epoch B1875.0, which means that due to precession of the equinoxes, the borders on a modern star map (e.g., for epoch J2000) are already somewhat skewed and no longer perfectly vertical or horizontal.  This skew will increase over the centuries to come.  However, this does not change the solid angle of any constellation.

Notes

See also

 Lists of astronomical objects

Sources
Constellations – Ian Ridpath
Constellations – RASC Calgary Centre

Area

IAU constellations